Paraman is a surname. Notable people with the surname include:

A. M. Paraman (1926–2018), Indian politician
Ellen Mary Paraman (1826–1892), governess to George Curzon, the future Viceroy of India